is a Shinto shrine on the island of Itsukushima (popularly known as Miyajima), best known for its "floating" torii gate.  It is in the city of Hatsukaichi in Hiroshima Prefecture in Japan, accessible from the mainland by ferry at Miyajimaguchi Station. The shrine complex is listed as a UNESCO World Heritage Site, and the Japanese government has designated several buildings and possessions as National Treasures.

The Itsukushima shrine is one of Japan's most popular tourist attractions. It is most famous for its dramatic gate, or torii on the outskirts of the shrine, the sacred peaks of Mount Misen, extensive forests, and its ocean view. The shrine complex itself consists of two main buildings: the Honsha shrine and the Sessha Marodo-jinja, as well as 17 other different buildings and structures that help to distinguish it.

History

Origin 
Itsukushima jinja was the chief Shinto shrine (ichinomiya) of Aki Province.

It is said to have been erected in 593 supposedly by Saeki Kuramoto during the reign of Empress Suiko (592–628 CE). However, the present shrine has been popularly attributed to Taira no Kiyomori, a prominent noble of the Imperial Court and later Chancellor (Daijō-daijin), who contributed heavily to the construction of the shrine during his time as governor of Aki Province in 1168. Another renowned patron of the shrine was Mori Motonari, lord of Chōshū Domain, who was responsible for rebuilding the honden in 1571. It is important to note, however, that as a result of waging war against Sue Takafusa there in 1555, Motonari is said to have tainted the island's grounds by battling on the island. Spilling blood violated the strict taboos meant to preserve the sacred purity associated with Shinto shrines. The only surviving structure in Itsukushima shrine from the Kamakura period is the Kyakuden or "Guest-God's Shrine".

Kiyomori 
It was not uncommon during the 12th century for the nobility to build shrines or take on other architectural projects in order to "reflect their power and splendor." The Taira are known specifically for their involvement in maritime trade with the Song dynasty (960–1279) and for attempting to monopolize overseas trade along the Inland Sea.

Kiyomori was at the height of his power when he established the Taira dominion over the island. He "ordered construction of the main hall of Itsukushima shrine as a display of reverence for the tutelary god of navigation and to serve as a base for maritime activities..." Miyajima soon became the Taira family shrine. Supposedly, Kiyomori chose the location also for the reason to further establish himself in the Heian aristocracy as one who deviated from the social norms of Shinto pilgrimage .  He lavished great wealth upon Itsukushima, and he enjoyed showing the place to his friends and colleagues, or even to royal personages..."

It is also said that Kiyomori rebuilt the shrine on account of a dream he had of an old monk who promised him dominion over Japan if he constructed a shrine on the island of Miyajima, and pay homage to its kami who are enshrined there for his success in life.   The renovations funded by the Taira allowed for Itsukushima to  "grow into an important religious complex."

Religious significance
The Itsukushima shrine is dedicated to the three daughters of Susano-o no Mikoto: Ichikishimahime no mikoto, Tagorihime no mikoto, and Tagitsuhime no mikoto. Otherwise known as the sanjoshin or "three female deities", these Shinto deities are the goddesses of seas and storms. Kiyomori believed the goddesses to be "manifestations of Kannon," therefore the island was understood as the home of the bodhisattva. In Japanese, the word Itsukushima translates to "island dedicated to the gods." The island itself is also considered to be a god, which is why the shrine was built on the outskirts of the island.  Adding to its sanctity, Mount Misen is the tallest peak at about 1,755 feet. Tourists can either hike or take a ropeway to the top.

Its treasures include the celebrated Heike Nōkyō, or "Sutras dedicated by the House of Taira."  These consist of thirty-two scrolls, on which the Lotus, Amida, and Heart sutras have been copied by Kiyomori, his sons, and other members of the family, each completing the transcription of one scroll, and it was "decorated with silver, gold, and mother-of-pearl by himself [Kiyomori] and other members of his clan."

Originally Itsukushima was a pure Shinto shrine "where no births or deaths were allowed to cause pollution. Because the island itself has been considered sacred, commoners were not allowed to set foot on it throughout much of its history to maintain its purity. Retaining the purity of the shrine is so important that since 1878, no deaths or births have been permitted near it. To this day, pregnant women are supposed to retreat to the mainland as the day of delivery approaches, as are the terminally ill or the very elderly whose passing has become imminent. Burials on the island are forbidden. To allow pilgrims to approach, the shrine was built like a pier over the water, so that it appeared to float, separate from the land. The red entrance gate, or torii, was built over the water for much the same reason. Commoners had to steer their boats through the torii before approaching the shrine.

Architecture 

Japan has gone to great lengths to preserve the twelfth-century-style architecture of the Shrine throughout history. The shrine was designed and built according to the Shinden-zukuri style,  equipped with pier-like structures over the Matsushima bay in order to create the illusion of floating on the water, separate from island, which could be approached by the devout "like a palace on the sea." This idea of intertwining architecture and nature is reflective of a popular trend during the 16th century as well as the Heian period in which Japanese structures tended to "follow after their environment," often allowing trees, water, and other forms of natural beauty to enter into the decor of homes and buildings. This led to a far more intimate relationship between the two.

The most recognizable and celebrated feature of the Itsukushima shrine, is its fifty-foot tall vermilion otorii gate ("great gate"), built of decay-resistant camphor wood. The placement of an additional leg in front of and behind each main pillar identifies the torii as reflecting the style of Ryōbu Shintō (dual Shinto), a medieval school of esoteric Japanese Buddhism associated with the Shingon Sect.  The torii appears to be floating only at high tide. When the tide is low, it is approachable by foot from the island. Gathering shellfish near the gate is popular at low tide. At night, powerful lights on the shore illuminate the torii. Although a gate has been in place at the site since 1168, the current structure dates  to 1875.

Shinto architecture has many distinct parts, most of which include the shrine's honden (main hall) and the unusually long haiden (main oratory), and its equally long heiden (offertory hall). The honden "is an eight-by-four bay structure with a kirizuma roof surfaced in cypress bark." Its walls are decorated in white stucco; they were constructed using a process requiring fifteen coats of white stucco, with vermilion woodwork.

Extending from the sides of the haraiden of the main shrine is a noh stage which dates from 1590.  Noh theater performances have long been used to pay homage to the gods through the ritual acting out of key events in Shinto myth.

On September 5, 2004, the shrine was severely damaged by Typhoon Songda. The boardwalks and roof were partially destroyed, and the shrine was temporarily closed for repairs. Today anyone can go visit the shrine for 300 yen.

See also 
List of National Treasures of Japan (crafts: others)
List of National Treasures of Japan (crafts: swords)
List of National Treasures of Japan (paintings)
List of National Treasures of Japan (shrines)
List of National Treasures of Japan (writings)
List of Shinto shrines
List of World Heritage Sites in Japan
Modern system of ranked Shinto shrines
Mont Saint-Michel, a sister city and a similar island-temple UNESCO World Heritage Site
Three Views of Japan
Tourism in Japan
Twenty-Two Shrines
Three Great Shrines of Benzaiten
Hiroshima to Honolulu Friendship Torii (Itsukushima replica)

Gallery

Artwork

References

External links

UNESCO World Heritage description
http://www.en.itsukushimajinja.jp/index.html 
Miyajima Guide including Itsukushima Shrine
National Archives of Japan: Itsukushima kakei

Beppyo shrines
Religious buildings and structures completed in 1168
World Heritage Sites in Japan
Shinto shrines in Hiroshima Prefecture
Gates in Japan
Tourist attractions in Hiroshima Prefecture
National Treasures of Japan
16th-century Shinto shrines
12th-century Shinto shrines
6th-century Shinto shrines
Kanpei-taisha